Stephen John "Steve" Binns (born 25 August 1960 in Keighley) is a male British former long-distance runner.

Athletics career
Binns competed in the 1988 Summer Olympics.

He rose to prominence in 1979 as a junior athlete. First he took the individual and team silver medals at the 1979 IAAF World Cross Country Championships junior race, then won the 5000 metres at the 1979 European Athletics Junior Championships – his winning time of 13:44.37 minutes remains the championship record as of 2014. He capped the season with a European junior record of 13:27.04 minutes in London.

As a senior athlete he competed five times at the IAAF World Cross Country Championships (1981 to 1988) and competed twice for Great Britain at the World Championships in Athletics (1983 and 1987). Representing England he was the silver medallist in the 10,000 metres at the 1986 Commonwealth Games in Edinburgh, Scotland behind compatriot Jon Solly.

References

1960 births
Living people
Sportspeople from Keighley
Athletes from Yorkshire
English male long-distance runners
Olympic athletes of Great Britain
Athletes (track and field) at the 1988 Summer Olympics
Commonwealth Games medallists in athletics
Athletes (track and field) at the 1986 Commonwealth Games
World Athletics Championships athletes for Great Britain
Commonwealth Games silver medallists for England
Medallists at the 1986 Commonwealth Games